The black mountain salamander (Desmognathus welteri) is a species of salamander in the family Plethodontidae.

Distribution and habitat
It is endemic to the southern Appalachian Mountains in the south-eastern United States. Its natural habitats are temperate forests, rivers,  freshwater marshes and springs.

Its range includes eastern Kentucky, southwestern Virginia, and eastern Tennessee. Its natural habitat is wooded mountainous countryside where it hides under rocks and logs in swift flowing streams, pools, and wet ditches.

It shares the same range as the seal salamander (Desmognathus monticola) and northern dusky salamander (Desmognathus fuscus) which are both more terrestrial, and the blackbelly salamander (Desmognathus quadramaculatus) which shares its aquatic habits.

Description
The black mountain salamander is one of a number of similar looking species of dusky salamanders inhabiting the upland locations in which it is found. The colour is variable but the upper parts are usually pale or medium brown with an indistinct pattern of paler markings. The under side is whitish with dark spots and blotches.

Reproduction
Courtship behaviour is not known for the black mountain salamander but reproduction takes place in the spring or summer. The female lays clusters of eggs in or just beside small fast flowing streams, in moist crevices, and among wet leaves in the splash zone. About 25 eggs with short stalks are attached to one another like a bunch of grapes. The eggs have large yolks and the larvae develop for some time inside them. The female guards and broods the eggs until they hatch. The larvae are aquatic and usually occupy quiet shallow areas of streams. The larval period lasts twenty to twenty-four months. After metamorphosis, the juveniles seem to occupy rather deeper water than the adults or spend more time on land, perhaps to avoid competition or to avoid encounters with blackbelly salamanders, which are cannibalistic.

Diet
The black mountain salamander is very secretive during daytime and may largely forage at night. The diet largely consists of flies, beetles and other insects, and the larvae of flies, butterflies and moths.

Status
The population of black mountain salamanders seems to be stable or in slight decline although detailed studies have not been performed. The areas in which it occurs are not heavily populated and its habitat is not under threat. Road building and strip mining have caused an increase in silting in some areas and in West Virginia the salamander is probably now rare.

References

Desmognathus
Amphibians of the United States
Ecology of the Appalachian Mountains
Endemic fauna of Kentucky
Endemic fauna of Tennessee
Endemic fauna of Virginia
Taxonomy articles created by Polbot
Amphibians described in 1950